The 2011–12 season was the fourth season that Melbourne Victory competed in the Australian W-League. The team finished fourth for the second time in two seasons and was eliminated in the semi-finals by eventual champions Canberra United.

Background
The Victory entered the 2011–12 season having finished fourth in 2010–11 and being eliminated in the semi-finals in their first finals appearance.

Vicki Linton returned for a second year as head coach, the only female coach in the W-League.

W-League

Regular season
Victory opened the season with a 2–0 victory over Perth Glory at the Veneto Club with Caitlin Friend and Amy Jackson scoring either side of half-time.

Playing against Sydney FC in their second match, the Victory lost a tight battle 2–1 with Sydney's guest player Megan Rapinoe scoring a winner late in the match.

Travelling to Canberra, Victory faced Canberra United at McKellar Park. Victory conceded two goals in the first half and Kendall Fletcher could only score a consolation goal with twelve minutes to play.

Returning to Victoria, the team faced winless Adelaide United at Veneto Club. Victory prevailed 4–0, with Caitlin Friend scoring three times.

In their sixth match of the season, Victory played Newcastle Jets in Geelong, marking Melissa Barbieri's return to Victoria. The Victory used her return to market the match and tried, unsuccessfully, to attract a W-League record crowd. Before the match, Barbieri complained, saying, "they are billing me, in front of their own players, to market the game and I think that's poor form." Ultimately, the Victory prevailed 2–1, with Jodie Taylor scoring two goals for the home team. 

Playing in Perth a week later, Victory faced a Perth Glory team who had been defeated 11–0 by Sydney FC the previous week. The Glory were also missing two players who had been suspended after a fight at training. Victory recorded their biggest win of the season in a 5–0 defeat with Katrina Gorry scoring a brace and Jodie Taylor a hat-trick.

Facing the undefeated Canberra United in late December, the Victory led early with Taylor converting a 20th minute penalty after Fletcher was brought down in the penalty area. Michelle Heyman equalised for Canberra in the 81st minute and the final score remained 1–1.

Entering their final match of the season against Adelaide United at Burton Park in Adelaide, the Victory were guaranteed of making the finals, with the Newcastle Jets losing to Perth Glory the day before. Had the Jets won, the Victory would have needed a point to lock in fourth spot. The Victory won comfortably with four players sharing in the goals in a 4–1 win over the Reds.

Finals
Having finished fourth, Victory faced Canberra United for the chance to play in the grand final. Canberra entered the match as firm favourites having gone through the season undefeated.

Victory were beaten 1–0 in Canberra having missed several chances to take the match. The winning goal was scored after 83 minutes when a  shot from Michelle Heyman deflected off Victory defender Rebekah Stott into the top right-hand corner of the goal.

League table

Results summary

Results by round

Venues
Melbourne Victory hosted five matches in the 2011–12 W-League season. Three matches were at the Veneto Club in Bulleen and two were played at Kardinia Park in Geelong.

Squad statistics

Source: Soccerway

Coaching staff
Vicki Linton returned for a second season at Melbourne Victory. Michael Edwards acted as an assistant for several matches before taking control of the 12 November match against Canberra United while Linton was coaching the Australia women's national under-17 soccer team at the 2011 AFC U-16 Women's Championship in China.

Transfers
In September, Linton made the decision to release national team goalkeeper Melissa Barbieri ahead of the season in favour of 16-year-old Brianna Davey.

England international Jodie Taylor returned to the club from Birmingham City in the FA Women's Super League (WSL). American players, Kendall Fletcher and Danielle Johnson from Sky Blue FC in Women's Professional Soccer (WPS) returned for a second season.

In October 2011, the Victory recruited Laura Spiranovic, sister of Australian men's international Matthew Spiranovic, from South Melbourne. Spiranovic had come off a big season in the Victorian Women's Premier League having won both the best player award as well as being the league's leading goalscorer.

Linton also brought in local players, Jackie Vogt, Cassandra Dimovski and Georgie Koutrouvelis.

In

Out

Awards
W-League Fair Play Award
W-League Young Player of the Year: Ashley Brown

References

Melbourne Victory
Melbourne Victory FC (A-League Women) seasons